Prepilin peptidase is an enzyme found in Type IV filament systems responsible for the maturation of the pilin. This enzyme catalyses the following chemical reaction

 Typically cleaves a -Gly-Phe- bond to release an N-terminal, basic peptide of 5-8 residues from type IV prepilin, and then N-methylates the new N-terminal amino group, the methyl donor being S-adenosyl-L-methionine.

This enzyme is present on the surface of many species of bacteria. All known enzymes with this activity are of the MEROPS family A24.

References

External links 
 
 MEROPS A24

EC 3.4.23